Derlis Alegre (born 10 January 1994) is a Paraguayan footballer who plays for Tembetary as a winger.

External links 
 

1994 births
Living people
Paraguayan footballers
Paraguay international footballers
Paraguayan Primera División players
Sportivo Luqueño players
Club Nacional footballers
Footballers at the 2015 Pan American Games
Association football forwards
Pan American Games competitors for Paraguay